Scuola Italiana di Montevideo (SIM) is an Italian international school in Carrasco, Montevideo, Uruguay. Its serves preschool (Casa dei bambini) until bachillerato or liceo Italiano, the senior high school programs.

The campus has  of area. The campus includes five courts and four gymnasiums.

Notable alumni
 Lorena Ponce de León, landscape architect and First Lady of Uruguay.

References

External links

  Scuola Italiana di Montevideo

Italian-Uruguayan culture
International schools in Uruguay
Schools in Montevideo
Private schools in Uruguay
Montevideo